Salimjon Aioubov (Mascho, USSR, April 18, 1960) is a journalist, reporter and writer.

Early in school years he started writing articles, anecdotes and stories which were published in children's newspapers in Soviet Tajikistan.

After graduating Tajikistan State University, Salimjon Aioubov worked at different publishing houses in Dushanbe and Moscow. He was an editor of political and social department of a social weekly newspaper ("Адабиёт ва санъат") Literature and Art, deputy editor Haftganj "Ҳафтганҷ" and editor-in-chief of Charogi Ruz "Чароғи рӯз". Salimjon Aioubov is an author of six books, he is a recipient an award of Journalists Union of CIS in 1991 and Otakhon Latifi Award in 2017.

Salimjon Aioubov is a Senior Broadcaster with RFE/RL’s Tajik Service. After graduating from Tajik State University in 1982, Salimjon worked for numerous Tajik media outlets in print, radio, and television.  From 1992-1997, he covered the civil war in Tajikistan, refugee issues, inter-Tajik peace talks under UN mediation, OIC conferences, and Shanghai Cooperation Organisation Summits. Salimjon has directed two short documentaries on Tajik issues, "Mi, Pereselentsi" (1986) and "Perpertual Returning" (1989), and published several books—most recently, "Hundred colors. Tajiks in the 20th Century" (Amsterdam, 2004).

References 

Tajikistani journalists
Tajikistani male writers
20th-century Tajikistani writers
21st-century Tajikistani writers
Tajikistani novelists
1960 births
Living people
Tajik National University alumni